Aegerita may refer to:

 Aegerita, genus of fungi including Aegerita penniseti, a.k.a. Beniowskia sphaeroidea
 Agrocybe aegerita, a species of mushroom in genus Agrocybe

See also 
 Aegirine, mineral
 Aegeria, a.k.a. nymph Egeria (mythology)